{{Infobox sportsperson
| name        = Ervin Katona
| other_names =
| image       = Ervin Katona 2010.JPG
| caption     = Katona in 2010
| birth_name  = Ervin Katona
| birth_date  = 
| birth_place = Subotica, SFR Yugoslavia
| known       =
| occupation  = Strongman
| nationality = Serbian
| term        =
| predecessor =
| successor   =
| party       =
| boards      =
| spouse      =
| partner     =
| children    =
| relations   =
| website     =
| footnotes   =
| employer    =
| height      = 
| weight      = 
| medaltemplates =

{{CompetitionRecord|3rd| SCL 2013/2013 Overall| }}

}}Ervin Katona''' (Serbian Cyrillic: Ервин Катона; born 5 January 1977) is a Serbian strongman competitor and regular entrant to the World's Strongest Man competition. He has competed in 99 International strongman competitions (fourth highest in history) and have won 17 of them, making him the seventh most decorated strongman in history. Katona is an ethnic Hungarian.

Biography 
Ervin Katona was a junior national kickboxing champion in his youth.  He later moved into the field of Strength athletics, and started weight training at the age of 25. He had soon won a number of Balkan titles and became the winner of the Serbia's Strongest Man title.

Katona became a member of the International Federation of Strength Athletes and following the latter's schism with World's Strongest Man could not compete in that event. He did compete, however, in the IFSA version in both 2006 and 2007. In 2008 he was a major figure on the Strongman Champions League circuit and consistent podium finishes earned him the overall runner-up spot behind his great friend Žydrūnas Savickas. In early 2009 in the Strongman Champions League event in his hometown Katona suffered a torn biceps. Despite this, Katona was able to recover in time to compete in the prestigious 2009 World's Strongest Man event in Malta, he was unable to qualify for the finals. In 2010, Katona was able to qualify for the World's Strongest Man finals and finished in 7th place. Katona also won 3 Strongman Champions League events in Bulgaria, Serbia and Slovakia in 2010. Katona finished second overall for the 2010 SCL season behind Terry Hollands.

Katona owns a gym in his home town of Subotica, which he cites as his greatest personal achievement. He entered in Big Brother VIP 2010 house and finished in fifth place after 28 days. Katona set a Guinness World Record on 25 April 2009 for longest time to restrain a vehicle weighing 980 kg (2,156 lbs) in Milan, Italy. His time was 1 minute 2 seconds.

Katona won the Strongman Champions League overall title for the 2011–2012 season, he had previously finished in 2nd overall in 2008 and 2010.

Personal records 
Squat – 400 kg (880 lbs)
Bench press – 300 kg (660 lbs) (with gear)
Deadlift – 400 kg (880 lbs)
Loglift – 195 kg (423 lbs) (gym record)

Competition record 
 2004
 7. – Europe's Strongest Man 2004
 2006
 3. – World Strongman Cup Federation 2006: Vienna
 12. – IFSA Strongman World Championships 2006, Reykjavík, Iceland
 2007
 3. – Europe's Strongest Team 2007
 6. – Europe's Strongest Man (IFSA) 2007
 3. – European Strongman Team Cup 2007
 11. – IFSA Strongman World Championships 2007, Geumsan, South Korea
 2008
 2. – Strongman Champions League 2008: Serbia
 1. – Europe's Strongest Team 2008
 4. – Strongman Champions League 2008: Holland
 3. – Strongman Champions League 2008: Bulgaria
 12. – Fortissimus, Canada
 5. – Strongman Champions League 2008: Lithuania
 2. – European Strongman Cup KBI 2008
 2. – Strongman Champions League 2008: Romania
 3. – Strongman Champions League 2008: Finland
 5. – World Log Lift Championships 2008, Vilnius, Lithuania
 2009
 8. – Arnold Strongman Classic, Columbus, Ohio USA
 4. – Strongman Champions League 2009: Serbia (injured)
 1. – Strongman Champions League 2009: Spain
 4. – World Log Lift Championships 2009, Vilnius, Lithuania
2010
 1. – Strongman Champions League 2010: Bulgaria
 3. – Strongman Champions League 2010: Holland
 1. – Strongman Champions League 2010: Serbia
 7. – 2010 World's Strongest Man, Sun City, South Africa
 1. – Strongman Champions League 2010: Slovakia
2011
 5. – World Log Lift Championships 2011, Vilnius, Lithuania
 3. – Strongman Champions League 2011: SCL Iceman Challenge
 1. – Strongman Champions League 2011: Serbia

References

1977 births
Living people
Serbian people of Hungarian descent
Sportspeople from Subotica
Hungarians in Vojvodina
Serbian strength athletes